Georgios Chatziandreou (born 1899, date of death unknown) was a Greek footballer. He competed in the men's tournament at the 1920 Summer Olympics.

References

1899 births
Year of death missing
Greek footballers
Olympic footballers of Greece
Footballers at the 1920 Summer Olympics
Place of birth missing
Association football forwards